Rosenborg was a tram stop on the Oslo Tramway. It was located on the shopping street Bogstadveien, in the area of the same name in the neighbourhood Hegdehaugen. The station was preceded by Schultz' gate on the Briskeby Line and succeeded by Homansbyen and Uranienborgveien on the Homansby and Briskeby Line, respectively. In 2005, the station was upgraded, with heightened platforms, new skeds and real-time monitors. In 2014, the stop was closed and replaced by the newly established Bogstadveien stop, located a bit further north on the Bogstadveien street, closer to Majorstuen. The succeeding Uranienborg stop was relocated to the street junction between Bogstadveien and Josefines gate, and renamed Rosenborg.

See also
 Bogstadveien tram stop
 Briskeby Line
 Homansbyen Line

References

Disused Oslo Tramway stations